A terrace crossing is a geographical zone between the sedimentation (downstream) part and the erosion (upstream) part of the river. This zone develops on the location where the transition of erosion to sedimentation takes place. Upstream of the crossing, terraces will exist. The highest terraces will be the oldest. Downstream of the crossing, older sediments will be buried beneath younger deposits.

See also
Riverterrace
Sedimentology

Fluvial landforms
Sedimentology
Geomorphology